Tuuli may refer to:

Tuuli is a Finno-Permic word meaning "wind"
Tuuli (name), Estonian and Finnish feminine given name
Finnish hovercraft Tuuli
Valmet Tuuli, Finnish aircraft
Tuuli is a Mongolic word meaning "epic"
Mongol epic poetry
Epic of Jangar
Epic of King Gesar
Tuuli, a Canadian pop-punk band